Great Melton is a civil parish in the English county of Norfolk.
For the purposes of local government, it falls within the district of South Norfolk.

There is a local legend that the area is haunted by a phantom coach, containing four ladies in white.

Notes

External links

South Norfolk
Villages in Norfolk
Civil parishes in Norfolk